"One Survive" is Mika Nakashima's third single. The single was released on the 6 March 2002. "One Survive", which boasts a sophisticated fusion of house and Latin jazz, was the theme song of Kodak MAX Beauty CM. It reached number eight on the Oricon Weekly Top 200, and the single sold 86,600 copies.

Track listing
One Survive
True Eyes
Crescent Moon (Gonga Massive Version)
One Survive (Blaze Shelter Remix)
One Survive (Instrumental)
True Eyes (Instrumental)

2002 singles
Mika Nakashima songs
Songs written by T2ya